

Buildings and structures

Buildings
 1110 – Reconstruction of Cathedral St Pierre of Angoulême begun.
 1110 – Original building of the Worms Cathedral, Holy Roman Empire consecrated (building now mostly disappeared).
 1111 – Bamberg Cathedral in the Holy Roman Empire consecrated.
 1112 – Mahadeva Temple of Itagi in the Western Chalukya Empire, India is built.
 about 1113–1150 – Construction of Angkor Wat, Cambodia.
 1114 – Lakshmi Devi temple, Doddagaddavalli built in the Hoysala Kingdom.
 1115 – Cloister of the  Saint-Pierre abbey in Moissac, France built.
 1117 – Reconstruction of San Zeno Maggiore in Verona, Italy begun.
 1117 – Chennakesava Temple, Belur, India (Hoysala Empire) commissioned by King Vishnuvardhana.
 1117 – Almoravid Koubba in Marrakesh built.
 1118 – Pisa Cathedral in Piazza dei Miracoli, Pisa, March of Tuscany consecrated (begun in 1063).
 1118 – Romanesque reconstruction of the Carolingian Abbey of Sant'Antimo near Siena, Italy, begun.
 1118 – Reconstruction of the Early Medieval building of Santa Maria in Cosmedin, Rome, begun.

Births

Deaths

12th-century architecture
1110s works